TCV is the third and final album by alternative rock band The Click Five. It was released in Asia on November 16, 2010, and was released in Europe the following year.

The singles "I Quit! I Quit! I Quit!", "The Way It Goes" and "Don't Let Me Go" were released to Asian radio stations

Track listing

Release history

Notes
"I Quit! I Quit! I Quit!" reached #7 on the Radio 91.3 Hot 30 Countdown in June 2009.
"The Way It Goes" reached #7 on the 987 Top 20 Countdown in September 2010
"Don't Let Me Go" reached #5 on the 987 Top 20 Countdown in January 2011.
The music video for Don't Let Me Go was released in April 2011.

References

2010 albums
The Click Five albums